The White AM armoured car (officially the Automitrailleuse White or abbreviated as the White AM) was a French First World War armoured car that was built on a commercial American White Motor Company truck chassis with armoured bodies supplied by the French firm Ségur & Lorfeuvre, it was used by the French military from its introduction in 1915.  Between the wars the French military completely rebuilt the vehicles as the White-Laffly AMD 50 and the Laffly-Vincennes AMD 80, in these guises it served until at least 1943.

Design

White AM
The White AM consisted of a turreted armoured car built upon imported American White truck chassis, with the armoured bodywork built and fitted in France, later vehicles were built upon locally manufactured White truck chassis. The layout was similar to other armoured cars of the period with a front mounted engine, driver and co-driver in the centre behind the engine with the turret immediately behind the drivers, a set of duplicated rear facing driver's controls were at the rear of the hull to allow the vehicle to safely be driven backwards at speed.

The fully enclosed turret housed a 37mm Puteaux SA 18 gun and an 8mm Hotchkiss M1914 machine gun, unusually the two weapons were at opposite sides of turret, in service this arrangement proved difficult for the gunner compared to a coaxial arrangement.

White-Laffly AMD 50
The White-Laffly AMD 50 upgrade saw the White chassis completely discarded, with armoured hull fitted to a Laffly chassis.

Laffly-Vincennes AMD 80
The Laffly-Vincennes AMD 80 was a further more comprehensive upgrade than the AMD 50. The White-Laffly AMD 80 also had a new turret which mounted a 13.2 mm Hotchkiss M1929 heavy machine gun, a coaxial 7.5 mm FM 24/29 machine gun and a second FM 24/29 mounted at the rear of the turret.

History
In 1915 France imported bare White Motor Company trucks chassis from the United States for which the French firm Ségur & Lorfeuvre designed, manufactured and fitted armoured hulls locally, the designers were able to draw upon lesson learnt from the earlier Renault and Peugeot armoured cars, the White combining the two weapons from the two variants of the Peugeot into the one turret. An initial batch of 20 vehicles were built, known as the White AM Mle 1915. In 1915 the Western Front had bogged down in trench warfare and there was little use in French service for armoured cars, so production was suspended.  In 1917 production was recommenced using locally manufactured White truck chassis, known as the White AM Mle 1917/1918, unlike the Mle 1915 they had right hand drive, approximately 230 were built. 205 White AMs were still in service by the war's end in 1918.

In the late 1920s the original White chassis were deemed to be completely worn out, but the armoured bodywork was seen to be in good condition so in 1927 and 1928 designs were drawn up to replace the chassis. The first prototype White-Laffly AMD 50 (AMD standing for Auto-Mitrailleuse de Découverte) was delivered in 1931 and 98 examples were upgraded, despite retaining none of the original White chassis the name White was retained to indicate the vehicle's origins. It was soon determined that a further upgrade was required and so in 1933 the first Laffly-Vincennes AMD 80 was delivered, in total 28 examples were produced before the French Army switched procurement to the completely new Panhard 178.

Service
By 1918 the French Army considered the White AM to be their best and most useful armoured car design and they were used extensively on the Western Front.

From 1937 both the White-Laffly AMD 50 and Laffly-Vincennes AMD 80 had been replaced in continental French service by the Panhard 178 and they were predominantly relegated to France's overseas territories, by May 1940 AMD 50s could be found in Algeria, Tunisia, Indochina and Lebanon although 13 remained in Metropolitan France, whilst all remaining AMD 80s were in French North Africa. The Metropolitan French examples were captured by the invading German forces and were briefly used by the Wehrmacht to train personnel. The vehicles in North Africa continued in service until at least 1943 when the remaining vehicles were replaced by American M8 Greyhounds. The  received a peloton of AM 80s in 1944 but they were replaced before 1946 by Panhard 165/175 armoured cars.

Gallery

See also
 List of combat vehicles of World War I
 List of armoured fighting vehicles of World War II

References

External links
 
 
 
 

World War I armoured cars
Armoured cars of the interwar period
White-Laffly AMD
World War I armoured fighting vehicles of France
Armoured cars of France